The Nerbudda Division, named after the Narmada River (Nerbudda), was a former administrative division of the Central Provinces of British India. It encompassed a good part of the Narmada River basin in the eastern part of present-day Madhya Pradesh state of India. The Nerbudda Division had an area of 47,609.2 km2 with a population of 1,785,008 in 1901.

The Central Provinces became the Central Provinces and Berar in 1936 until the Independence of India.

Territory
The main mountains in the division were the Mahadeo Hills, the central part of the Satpura Range, where Pachmarhi, the summer hill station for British officials, and the Pachmarhi Cantonment were located. 

The main towns in the division were Hoshangabad (15,863 inhabitants in 1881), Burhanpur (33,341 inhabitants in 1901) and Gadarwara (6,978 in 1901); other important towns were Khandwa, Harda, Narsinghpur, Chhindwara, Pandhurna, Sohagpur, Seoni and Mohgaon.

Administrative divisions

Districts
The Nerbudda Division included the following districts:
Narsinghpur
Hoshangabad
Nimar, present-day Khandwa (East Nimar) and Khargone (West Nimar)
Betul
Chhindwara

Princely states
Makrai State was the only princely state within the division and was under the supervision of the Nerbudda commissioner.

See also
Central Provinces, Administration
Saugor and Nerbudda Territories

References

 McEldowney, Philip F. (1980). Colonial Administration and Social Developments in middle India: The Central Provinces, 1861–1921. Ph.D. dissertation.

Divisions of British India
States and territories established in 1853